The Right Juice is an English-language comedy-drama film produced in Algarve, Portugal.  Directed by Kristjan Knigge, the original screenplay has been written by David Butler-Cole and Kristjan Knigge.  Produced by Barbara Jane Boulter and Co-Produced by Chris Parker, the film is starring Mark Killeen, Lúcia Moniz, Miguel Damião, Ellie Chidzey, and Beau McClellan.  The film is about a, failed, bankrupt and fresh from the city, who is pursuing fulfillment by growing oranges on an old farm. He and his neighbour face unprincipled enemies in a highly amusing quest to save their valley from exploitation.

Plot
Oliver, failed, bankrupt and fresh from the city, is again pursuing his financial ambitions by attempting to grow oranges on an old farm. His wife Sally despairs of the appalling facilities. When Oliver discovers the land is barren for reasons that are more sinister than appear at first glance, he and his neighbour Manel face unprincipled enemies in a highly amusing quest to save the valley from exploitation. In their battle, they are joined by the lovely Nesta, her beauty a foil for both Oliver and his enemies.

Cast and characters
 Mark Killeen as Oliver Fellows
 Lúcia Moniz as Nesta 
 Miguel Damião as Manel António Coelho dos Santos Guerreiro 
 Ellie Chidzey as Sally Fellows
 Beau McClellan as Andreus Dranius

Production
Principal photography for the production was completed in Southern Portugal in April and early May 2012. In addition to crowd funding and loan financing, The Right Juice has been supported by various sponsors, such as Holiday Inn, Intermarche, Vila Vita, LeasePlan and many other local businesses. The project has been actively supported by the Algarve Tourism Board and the Algarve Film Commission.

Filming locations
 Algarve, Portugal
 Estombar, Portugal
 Zoomarine

References

External links
 
 

Films set in Portugal
Films shot in the Algarve
2010s English-language films